Redeemer Classical Academy is a private Christian school located in Murfreesboro, Tennessee, with a focus on Classical Christian education. Redeemer Classical Academy serves students in kindergarten through 12th grade. The school's main objective is to employ traditional Classical methods and curricula and a Christ-centered approach to all aspects of the school life through a rigorous academic course of study and Christian discipleship. Redeemer Classical Academy's motto is Omnia per Eum or "All Things through Him." Redeemer Classical Academy is a member of the Association of Classical and Christian Schools.

References

External links
 Official website

Private schools in Tennessee
Christian schools in Tennessee
Schools in Rutherford County, Tennessee
Classical Christian schools
Nondenominational Christian schools in the United States
Educational institutions established in 2004
2004 establishments in Tennessee